Ozioma Akagha is an actress based in the United States. She voices Alyx Vance in the video game Half-Life: Alyx (2020) and Julianna in the video game Deathloop (2021). She also plays the role of Harper Omereoha in the television show Delilah.

Career
Akagha attended Southern Methodist University in Dallas, Texas, where she majored in theatre. In the early 2010s, she acted in theatrical productions in California. In 2010, she played Tiger Lily in the Pacific Conservatory of the Performing Arts's production of Peter Pan. In 2011, she acted alongside Brendan Cataldo in Leo Cortez's play, Acting Out, at the Alisal Center for the Fine Arts. In 2012, Akagha began playing the leads in various short films and making guest appearances in television series. She appeared in one-off episodes in the series Men at Work, Nashville and 2 Broke Girls.

Akagha started voice acting in video games around 2016, first voicing the character "Plastic" in the game Mirror's Edge: Catalyst. In 2017, she was a voice actor for Wolfenstein II: The New Colossus, in which she provided voices for characters Barbara Casey, Zena Woodard, and Angela Cummings.

In 2018, she began appearing in Marvel's Runaways television series as Tamar, a recurring, supporting role. She provided the voice for the superheroine Bumblebee in the animated series Teen Titans Go!. Bumblebee initially appeared in the show's fifth season in the episode "Forest Pirates", which aired in 2019.

Akagha voiced the main character, Alyx Vance, in the virtual reality game Half-Life: Alyx. The character was first introduced in the game Half-Life 2 in 2004, being originally played by Merle Dandridge. A new actor was chosen for Alyx Vance partially due to the character's younger age and the "time gap" between this and the previous game. Akagha began recording for the role in September 2019, and the game was released in 2020.

In the 2021 video game Deathloop, Akagha voiced Julianna, one of two main characters and the main antagonist in the game. She also played Harper Omereoha in the OWN drama television series, Delilah, which started airing in 2021.

In the sixth episode of Marvel's animated anthology, What If...?, Akagha played the part of Wakandan princess Shuri. The episode, titled "What If... Killmonger Rescued Tony Stark?", aired in 2021. She also voiced the recurring role of Flora Flamingo in the 2021 children's show, Do, Re & Mi.

Honors
In 2021, Akagha was nominated for the Golden Joystick Awards in the category of Best Performer for voicing the character Julianna Blake in Deathloop. For the same role, she was also nominated for Best Performance at The Game Awards 2021, and for the Great White Way Award for Best Acting in a Game at the New York Game Awards 2022.

Filmography

Video games

Television

Film

Accolades

References

External links

Year of birth missing (living people)
American voice actresses
American video game actresses